Abdulaziz al-Bishi (born 11 March 1994) is a Saudi Arabian professional footballer who currently plays as a winger for Al-Ittihad.

Career statistics

International
Statistics accurate as of match played 9 June 2022.

International goals
Scores and results list Saudi Arabia's goal tally first.

Honours

Al-Ittihad
Saudi Super Cup: 2022

References

External links
 

Living people
1994 births
Association football midfielders
Saudi Arabian footballers
Hetten FC players
Al-Shabab FC (Riyadh) players
Al-Taawoun FC players
Al-Faisaly FC players
Ittihad FC players
Footballers at the 2014 Asian Games
People from Jizan Province
Saudi Professional League players
2019 AFC Asian Cup players
Asian Games competitors for Saudi Arabia
Saudi Arabia international footballers
Saudi Arabia youth international footballers
21st-century Saudi Arabian people
20th-century Saudi Arabian people